Curtis Isaiah Keaton (born October 18, 1976 in Columbus, Ohio) is a former American football running back in the National Football League. He was drafted by the Cincinnati Bengals in the fourth round of the 2001 NFL Draft and also played for the New Orleans Saints. He played college football for the James Madison Dukes and West Virginia Mountaineers.  He attended Beechcroft High School in Columbus, Ohio.

References

1976 births
Living people
Players of American football from Columbus, Ohio
American football running backs
James Madison Dukes football players
West Virginia Mountaineers football players
Cincinnati Bengals players
New Orleans Saints players